Crane fly is a common name referring to any member of the insect family Tipulidae. Cylindrotominae, Limoniinae, and Pediciinae have been ranked as subfamilies of Tipulidae by most authors, though occasionally elevated to family rank. In the most recent classifications, only Pediciidae is now ranked as a separate family, due to considerations of paraphyly. In colloquial speech, crane flies are sometimes known as "mosquito hawks", "skeeter-eater", or "daddy longlegs", (a term also used to describe opiliones (harvestmen) and members of the spider family Pholcidae, both of which are arachnids). The larvae of crane flies are known commonly as leatherjackets.

Crown group crane flies have existed since at least the Barremian stage of the Early Cretaceous and are found worldwide, though individual species usually have limited ranges. They are most diverse in the tropics but are also common in northern latitudes and high elevations.

Tipulidae is one of the largest groups of flies, including over 15,000 species and subspecies in 525 genera and subgenera. Most crane flies were described by the entomologist Charles Paul Alexander, a fly specialist, in over 1000 research publications.

Description

Summary 

An adult crane fly, resembling an oversized male mosquito, typically has a slender body and stilt-like legs that are deciduous, easily coming off the body. The antennae have up to 19 segments. It is also characterized by a V-shaped suture or groove on the back of the thorax (mesonotum) and by its wing venation. The rostrum is long and in some species as long as the head and thorax together.

Formal 

Tipulidae are medium to large-sized flies with elongated legs, wings, and abdomen. Their colour is yellow, brown or grey. Ocelli are absent. The rostrum (a snout) is short to very short with a beak-like point called the nasus (rarely absent). The apical segment of the maxillary palpi is flagelliform and much longer than the subapical segment. The antennae have 13 segments (exceptionally 14–19). These are whorled, serrate, or ctenidial. There is a distinct V-shaped suture between the mesonotal prescutum and scutum (near the level of the wing bases). The wings are monochromatic, longitudinally striped or marbled. In females the wings are sometimes rudimentary. The sub-costal vein (Sc) joins through Sc2 with the radial vein, Sc1 is at most a short stump. There are four, rarely (when R2 is reduced) three branches of the radial vein merging into the alar margin. The discoidal wing cell is usually present. The wing has two anal veins. Sternite 9 of the male genitalia has, with few exceptions, two pairs of appendages. Sometimes appendages are also present on sternite 8. The female ovipositor has sclerotized valves and the cerci have a smooth or dentate lower margin. The valves are sometimes modified into thick bristles or short teeth.

The larva is elongated, usually cylindrical. The posterior two-thirds of the head capsule is enclosed or retracted within the prothoracic segment. The larva is metapneustic (with only one pair of spiracles, these on the anal segment of the abdomen), but often with vestigial lateral spiracles (rarely apneustic). The head capsule is sclerotized anteriorly and deeply incised ventrally and often dorsolaterally. The mandibles are opposed and move in the horizontal or oblique plane. The abdominal segments have transverse creeping welts. The terminal segments of the abdomen are glabrous, often partially sclerotized and bearing posterior spiracles. The spiracular disc is usually surrounded by lobe-like projections and anal papillae or lobes.

Biology 

The adult female usually contains mature eggs as she emerges from her pupa, and often mates immediately if a male is available. Males also search for females by walking or flying. Copulation takes a few minutes to hours and may be accomplished in flight.  Adults have a lifespan of 10 to 15 days.  The female immediately oviposits, usually in wet soil or mats of algae. Some lay eggs on the surface of a water body or in dry soils, and some reportedly simply drop them in flight. Most crane fly eggs are black in color. They often have a filament, which may help anchor the egg in wet or aquatic environments.

Crane fly larvae (leatherjackets) have been observed in many habitat types on dry land and in water, including marine, brackish, and fresh water. They are cylindrical in shape, but taper toward the front end, and the head capsule is often retracted into the thorax. The abdomen may be smooth, lined with hairs, or studded with projections or welt-like spots. Projections may occur around the spiracles. Larvae may eat algae, microflora, and living or decomposing plant matter, including wood. Some are predatory.

Ecology 

Larval habitats include all kinds of freshwater, semiaquatic environments. Some Tipulinae, including Dolichopeza, are found in moist to wet cushions of mosses or liverworts. Ctenophora species are found in decaying wood or sodden logs. Nephrotoma and Tipula larvae are found in dry soils of pasturelands, lawns, and steppe. Tipulidae larvae are also found in rich organic earth and mud, in wet spots in woods where the humus is saturated, in leaf litter or mud, decaying plant materials, or fruits in various stages of putrefaction.

Larvae can be important in the soil ecosystem, because they process organic material and increase microbial activity. Larvae and adults are also valuable prey items for many animals, including insects, spiders, fish, amphibians, birds, and mammals.

Adult crane flies may be used for transport by aquatic species of the mite family Ascidae. This is known as phoresis.

Pest status 

The European crane fly, Tipula paludosa and the marsh crane fly T. oleracea are agricultural pests in Europe. Crane fly larvae of economic importance live in the top layers of soil where they feed on the roots, root hairs, crown, and sometimes the leaves of crops, stunting their growth or killing the plants. They are pests on a variety of commodities. Since the late 1900s, T. paludosa and T. oleracea have become invasive in the United States. The larvae have been observed on many crops, including vegetables, fruits, cereals, pasture, lawn grasses, and ornamental plants.

In 1935, Lord's Cricket Ground in London was among venues affected by leatherjackets. Several thousand were collected by ground staff and burned, because they caused bald patches on the pitch and the pitch took unaccustomed spin for much of the season.

Phylogenetics 

The phylogenetic position of the Tipulidae remains uncertain. The classical viewpoint that they are an early branch of Diptera—perhaps (with the Trichoceridae) the sister group of all other Diptera—is giving way to modern views that they are more highly derived. This is thanks to evidence from molecular studies, which is consistent with the more derived larval characters similar to those of 'higher' Diptera. The Pediciidae and Tipulidae are sister groups (the "limoniids" are a paraphyletic clade). Specifically, Limoniinae has recently been treated by numerous authors at the rank of family, but subsequent phylogenetic analyses revealed that the remaining groups of tipulids render the group paraphyletic. The Cylindrotominae appear to be a relict group that was much better represented in the Tertiary. Tipulidae probably evolved from ancestors in the Upper Jurassic, the Architipulidae, and representatives of the Limoniinae are known from the Upper Triassic.

Genera 

 Subfamily Ctenophorinae
 Ctenophora Meigen, 1803
 Dictenidia Brulle, 1833
 Phoroctenia Coquillett, 1910
 Pselliophora Osten Sacken, 1887
 Tanyptera Latreille, 1804
 Subfamily Cylindrotominae
 Cylindrotoma Macquart, 1834
 Diogma Edwards, 1938
 Liogma Osten Sacken, 1869
 Phalacrocera Schiner, 1863
 Stibadocera Enderlein, 1912
 Stibadocerella Brunetti, 1918
 Stibadocerina Alexander, 1929
 Stibadocerodes Alexander, 1928
 Triogma Schiner, 1863
 Subfamily Dolichopezinae
 Dolichopeza Curtis, 1825
 Subfamily Limoniinae
 see List of Limoniine genera
 Subfamily Tipulinae
 Acracantha Skuse, 1890
 Angarotipula Savchenko, 1961
 Austrotipula Alexander, 1920
 Brachypremna Osten Sacken, 1887
 Brithura Edwards, 1916
 Clytocosmus Skuse, 1890
 Elnoretta Alexander, 1929
 Euvaldiviana Alexander, 1981
 Goniotipula Alexander, 1921
 Holorusia Loew, 1863
 Hovapeza Alexander, 1951
 Hovatipula Alexander, 1955
 Idiotipula Alexander, 1921
 Indotipula Edwards, 1931
 Ischnotoma Skuse, 1890
 Keiseromyia Alexander, 1963
 Leptotarsus Guerin-Meneville, 1831
 Macgregoromyia Alexander, 1929
 Megistocera Wiedemann, 1828
 Nephrotoma Meigen, 1803
 Nigrotipula Hudson & Vane-Wright, 1969
 Ozodicera Macquart, 1834
 Platyphasia Skuse, 1890
 Prionocera Loew, 1844
 Prionota van der Wulp, 1885
 Ptilogyna Westwood, 1835
 Scamboneura Osten Sacken, 1882
 Sphaerionotus de Meijere, 1919
 Tipula Linnaeus, 1758
 Tipulodina Enderlein, 1912
 Valdiviana Alexander, 1929
 Zelandotipula Alexander, 1922

Common names 

Numerous other common names have been applied to the crane fly. Many of the names are more or less regional in the U.S., including mosquito hawk, mosquito eater, gallinipper, and gollywhopper. They are also known as "daddy longlegs" in English-speaking countries outside of the U.S., not to be confused with the U.S. usages of "daddy long legs" that refer to either arachnids of the order Opiliones or the family Pholcidae. The larvae of crane flies are known commonly as leatherjackets.

They are also known as Jenny long legs in Scotland. In Ireland they are also known as Skinny Philip, and as Pilib an Gheataire in Gaelic (Gaeilge).

Misconceptions 

There is an enduring urban legend that crane flies are the most venomous insects in the world, but have no ability to administer the venom; this is not true. The myth likely arose due to their being confused with the cellar spider as they are also informally called "daddy longlegs", and although the arachnid does possess venom, it is not especially potent.

Despite widely held beliefs that adult crane flies (or "mosquito hawks") prey on mosquito populations, the adult crane fly is anatomically incapable of killing or consuming other insects. Although the adults of some species may feed on nectar, the adults of many species have such short lifespans that they do not eat at all.

See also 

 Tipularia discolor, the crane fly orchid

References

Further reading 

 Identification
 Pierre C.,1924, Diptères: Tipulidae Faune de France n° 8 Bibliotheque Virtuelle Numerique Out of date but online at no cost. In French.
 R. L. Coe, Paul Freeman & P. F. Mattingly Nematocera: families Tipulidae to Chironomidae (Tipulidae). Handbooks for the Identification of British Insects Vol 9 Part 2 i. pdf download manual Out of date but online at no cost
 J.F. McAlpine, B.V. Petersen, G.E. Shewell, H.J. Teskey, J.R. Vockeroth, D.M. Wood. Eds. 1987 Manual of Nearctic Diptera Volume 1 Research Branch Agriculture Canada, 1987 pdf key to Nearctic genera
 E. N. Savchenko Family Tipulidae in Bei-Bienko, G. Ya, 1988 Keys to the insects of the European Part of the USSR Volume 5 (Diptera) Part 2 English edition. Keys to Palaearctic species but now needs revision.

External links 

 Ohioline.osu.edu, Ohio State University Fact Sheet
 Family Tipulidae at EOL
IZ.carnegiemnh.org, Crane Flies of Pennsylvania, Extensive Specimen Collection, Carnegie Museum of Natural History
NLBIF.eti.uva.nl, Catalog of Craneflies of the World
 Diptera.info, Image Gallery
 BugGuide.net, photo gallery, many species
 Gaga.jes.mlc.edu.tw, Tipulidae of Taiwan , with images under Latin binomials
Crane Fly, Field Guide to Common Texas Insects

Species lists 

 West Palaearctic including Russia
 Australasian/Oceanian
 Nearctic
 Japan

 

Extant Late Jurassic first appearances
Taxa named by Pierre André Latreille